Clitheroe is a town in Lancashire, England.

Clitheroe may also refer to:

 Clitheroe (surname), a surname
 Clitheroe F.C., a football club